Stephen Whittaker (28 June 19477 February 2003) was a British actor and director. He worked largely in British film and television, and attended Henley-in-Arden School in Warwickshire before further training as an actor at London's Corona Academy. He began his career aged 17, as a "bad boy" in the film To Sir With Love (1966), and in the classic BBC Doctor Who adventure The Web of Fear, as a soldier battling Yeti in the London Underground.

In 1985 Whittaker took a director's training course, and directed a short training film which he sent to John Schlesinger (who had directed him in Yanks). Schlesinger suggested him to producer Mark Shivas as director for Channel 4's drama trilogy What If It's Raining?, written by Anthony Minghella. This was the beginning of a directing career of prestigious TV and film work. Shortly before Whittaker's death, writer Julian Fellowes spoke of him as, "the most exciting director in the industry."

In 2001 he filmed his final project The Rocket Post, a romantic drama set on a remote Scottish island. The film had severe funding problems, and was eventually released in 2006, three years after his death. The credits bear a dedication to his memory. Whittaker died following complications from a routine surgery.

Director
 What If It's Raining (1985) (TV)
 Eurocops: Hunting the Squirrel (1988) (TV), crime drama written by Billy Hamon, starring John Benfield
 Portrait of a Marriage (1990) (TV)
 Agatha Christie's Poirot (1 episode, 1992) - "Death in the Clouds" (1992) TV episode
 Inspector Morse (1 episode, 1993) - "The Day of the Devil" (1993) TV episode
 Closing Numbers (1993)
 Killing Me Softly (1995) (TV)
 Hearts and Minds (1995) (TV)
 Stone Cold (1997) Producer Andy Rowley BBC Scene
 Tangier Cop (1997) ... aka Heartbreak City
 Stone, Scissors, Paper (1997) (TV)
 A Life for a Life (1998) (TV)
 Grafters (1998) TV mini-series (unknown episodes)
 Grafters II (1999) TV mini-series
 Dalziel and Pascoe (1 episode, 2000) - "A Sweeter Lazarus" (2000) TV episode producer Andy Rowley
 The Life and Adventures of Nicholas Nickleby (2001) (TV)
 Sons and Lovers (2003) (TV)
 The Rocket Post (2004)

Actor
 Out of the Unknown (1966, 1 episode) .... Harold
 To Sir, with Love (1967) .... Schoolboy
 Doctor Who (1968, episode: The Web of Fear) .... Craftsman Weams
 Up the Junction (1968) .... Alf (uncredited)
 Chastity (1969) .... Eddie
 Strange Report (1969, 1 episode) .... The Office Boy
 Bury Me an Angel (1972) .... Killer (as Stephen Wittaker)
 I Escaped from Devil's Island (1973) .... Leper Count
 Dinosaur (1975)
 The Great Gundown (1977) .... Laredo
 Yanks (1979) .... Merchant seaman
 The Keep (1983) .... S.S. Commando
 Blott on the Landscape (1985, 1 episode) .... Orderly (final appearance)

External links
 Obituary in The Guardian website

References

British male television actors
British film directors
1947 births
2003 deaths
British male film actors